The name can also be spelled as
Sanadya Brahmin or Sanadh Brahmin, or Sanah Brahmin or Sanidya Brahmin or Sanadhya Gour Chaurasiya Brahmin are a community of agrarian Brahmins. Their main concentration is in western Uttar Pradesh, Rajasthan, Delhi and Madhya Pradesh area of India. The Hindi poet Keshabdasa Mishra was a Sanadhya, and praised his community in his Ramachandrika.

References

Brahmin communities of Uttar Pradesh
Brahmin communities of Madhya Pradesh
Brahmin communities of Rajasthan
Brahmin communities of Delhi